Hans Wieselgren (born 26 March 1952) is a Swedish fencer. He competed in the team épée event at the 1972 Summer Olympics. Wieselgren attended New York University and was in the class of 1977. He fenced for the university where he was named team MVP twice and led NYU to a 1976 NCAA championship.  Wieselgren is currently the epee fencing coach at Morristown High School in Morristown, New Jersey.

References

External links
 

1952 births
Living people
Swedish male épée fencers
Olympic fencers of Sweden
Fencers at the 1972 Summer Olympics
Sportspeople from Gothenburg